Charles Cocks may refer to:

Charles Cocks, 1st Baron Somers (1725–1806), British politician; Member of Parliament for Reigate
Charles Cocks (1646–1727), British Member of Parliament for Droitwich and Worcester

See also
Charles Cox (disambiguation)